Lasky is a Ukrainian village in the Korosten Raion (district) of Zhytomyr Oblast (province).

Lasky was previously located in Narodychi Raion until was abolished on 18 July 2020 as part of the administrative reform of Ukraine, which reduced the number of raions of Zhytomyr Oblast to four. The area of Narodychi Raion was merged into Korosten Raion.

Notable people
Anatoly Onoprienko, serial/mass murderer

References 

Villages in Korosten Raion